Senator McFarlane may refer to:

Arch W. McFarlane (1885–1960), Iowa State Senate
William D. McFarlane (1894–1980), Texas State Senate

See also
Duncan McFarlan (died 1816), North Carolina State Senate